Fred Anderson (born 1 April 1994) is a New Zealand cricketer. He played in four first-class and four List A matches for Canterbury in 2014/15.

See also
 List of Canterbury representative cricketers

References

External links
 

1994 births
Living people
New Zealand cricketers
Canterbury cricketers
Cricketers from Christchurch